Kambel Karim Bakhsh (also Romanized as Kambel Karīm Bakhsh; also known as Karīm Bakhsh Bāzār) is a village in Kambel-e Soleyman Rural District, in the Central District of Chabahar County, Sistan and Baluchestan Province, Iran. At the 2006 census, its population was 537, in 94 families.

References 

Populated places in Chabahar County